The  is a professional baseball team based in Hiroshima, Japan. They compete in the Central League of Nippon Professional Baseball. Mazda is the largest single shareholder (34.2%), which is less than the portion owned by the Matsuda family (about 60%). Because of that, Mazda is not considered the owner firm. The Carp are the only one of the 28 Asian professional baseball teams to be majority privately owned.

History

Early years
The Nippon Professional Baseball league was planned to be split into two separate leagues in 1949, and Hiroshima prefecture decided to establish a professional baseball team as part of the reconstruction process after the Atomic bombings of Hiroshima and Nagasaki. The team joined the Central League in December 1949 as the Hiroshima Carp. They were named the Carp after the koi fish that climbed the rapids of Hiroshima Castle, which signifies Hiroshima's rebirth after the above said bombings of Hiroshima and Nagasaki in World War 2.

The team's first home field was a prefecture-funded stadium, and the team's lack of sponsorship made it extremely difficult to recruit players. Manager Hideichi Ishimoto had to personally scout players just to form a starting lineup. The ragtag team ended up in last place from 1950 to 1951.

The team's lack of funding became an even more serious problem in 1951, and it was proposed by NPB that the team be disbanded, or merge with the Taiyo Whales team, which was based in Shimonoseki, Yamaguchi at the time. Hiroshima citizens strongly protested against disbanding the team, and raised the money needed to keep the team through donations.

The Central League had seven teams in 1952, making it complicated to form a coherent schedule for each team. Therefore, it was decided that any team that ended the season with a winning percentage below .300 would be disbanded or merged with another team. This agreement may have targeted the Carp, since the team had been in last place every season. The team won only 37 games in 1952, mostly on the back of ace Ryōhei Hasegawa, but ended with a .316 winning percentage, saving itself from being disbanded. The Shochiku Robins ended the season in last place with a .288 winning percentage, and was merged with the Taiyo Whales. While the Robins "merged" with the Whales, they had actually ceased operations prior to the merger, leaving most of their star players as free agents; Hiroshima signed most of them as a result.

The team's financial plight only worsened in the following years, and the team could only issue one uniform per player in 1953. Nevertheless, the team continued to play each season. The team moved to the newly constructed Hiroshima Municipal Stadium in central Hiroshima in July 1957. Finally, in 1960, they ended the season above the .500 mark.

In 1968, the Toyo Kogyo company became the team's chief sponsor, and the company name was inserted to become the Hiroshima Toyo Carp. The company was renamed Mazda Motor Corporation in 1984 after the Matsuda family sold their stakes in the company to Ford, but kept their 60% stake in the team, which they hold onto to this very day. The Toyo name remains memorialized in the name of the baseball team, although the team is rarely mentioned by its full name. The team ended the season above 3rd place for the first time the year corporate sponsorship started, but fell back into last place from 1972 to 1974.

"Akaheru" golden age

Red became the new team color in 1973, and the team's uniforms were redesigned. The current team uniform still resembles the 1973 design. The team logo was also changed from a letter "H" to a red "C" in imitation of the Cincinnati Reds logo..

The team hired its first non-Japanese manager, Joe Lutz, in 1975, becoming the first Japanese professional team to hire a foreign manager. Lutz ordered the team's cap to be changed to red to symbolize a never-ending fighting spirit, and he hired Gail Hopkins and Richie Scheinblum. A month into the season, Lutz and the Carp parted ways after a dispute with the front office. Whether he was fired, or quit is not clear. However, the team won its first ever league championship in 1975 to begin a memorable series of seasons.

The Carp team became a powerhouse in 1978, hitting over 200 home runs in one season for the first time in Japanese baseball history. Koji Yamamoto, Sachio Kinugasa, Jim Lyttle and Adrian Garrett formed the powerful Akaheru (meaning "Red Helmet") lineup, which won two consecutive pennants and Japan Series from 1979 to 1980. A strong pitching staff led to another Japan Series win in 1984. Manager Takeshi Koba retired in 1985, but the team still won the pennant the following year.

Star player Koji Yamamoto became manager in 1989, and the team won yet another pennant in 1991. However, the team fell into last place in 1993, and Yamamoto resigned from his position.

Dark years
The Carp would endure a lengthy period without success after their 1991 pennant.

One of the major reasons for the team's demise was the lack of financial support it received from its sponsors. The team never signed any free agents, and was often forced to let go of star players because they could no longer pay their salaries (recent examples include Tomoaki Kanemoto, Akira Etoh, Andy Sheets, Nate Minchey, John Bale, Greg LaRocca and Takahiro Arai). The Hiroshima Carp were the last Japanese team to have a non-Japanese player on its roster (excluding Japanese-Americans). Zoilo Versalles, the 1965 American League MVP,  was the first non-Japanese player to play for the Carp.

Marty Brown became the manager in 2006, becoming the team's first non-Japanese manager in 31 years (since Joe Lutz). The team set a new record in April, 2006, scoring only 2 runs for the first 9 games of the season. Through still not finishing above third, the team concentrated on developing potential young players. In 2008, even though they were expected to finish last place as both the ace Hiroki Kuroda and slugger Takahiro Arai were gone by free agency, their chance of entering of playoffs was not eliminated until the very end of the season (when only 3 games remained), and they finished fourth, closely following Chunichi Dragons.

Beginning with the 2009 season, the team's home has been the New Hiroshima Municipal Stadium, also known as Mazda Zoom-Zoom Stadium, in the Minami (South) Ward of Hiroshima.

Resurgence
After years of futility, the Carp finally regained success in 2016, finishing the regular season with NPB's best record and defeating the Yokohama DeNA BayStars in the Climax Series Final to advance to their first Japan Series since 1991, where they faced the Hokkaido Nippon-Ham Fighters. The Carp won the first two games of the series at home, but the Fighters would win the next four games en route to the championship. After the season Hiroki Kuroda, who had returned to the Carp in 2015 following a stint in Major League Baseball, retired.

The Carp again finished with the Central League's best record in 2017, but were upset by the BayStars in a rematch of the previous year's Climax Series Final.

In 2018, the Carp captured another Central League Pennant and swept the Yomiuri Giants in the Climax Series Final. However, they once again came up short in the Japan Series, falling to the Fukuoka SoftBank Hawks in five games.

The Carp finished the 2019 campaign in fourth place, missing the playoffs by a half game and ending the team's run of three consecutive Central League Pennants.

In 2020, the Carp finished 5th and once again missed the playoffs for a second consecutive year.

The Carp would finish in 4th place in the 2021 campaign, losing a playoff spot by just 2 games.

The 2022 season would begin with a major loss for the Carp, losing star player Seiya Suzuki after getting posted to the Chicago Cubs. Despite the setback, Hiroshima began the season 8-4 in their first 12 games. Despite the strong start, they missed out on the playoffs again, going 66-74-3.

Uniforms
The former uniforms of the Hiroshima Toyo Carp are similar to the Major League Baseball team the Cincinnati Reds. The original uniforms of the Hiroshima Carp are descendants of the uniforms worn by the University of Chicago's varsity baseball team, which toured Japan in 1912 playing against major university teams. One team they played was Chuo University who copied the uniforms including the distinctive "C" logo. Alumni of the Chuo University team helped in founding the Hiroshima Carp.

Current roster

Mascots and characters

 One of the team's two mascot's, "Carp Boy"(カープ坊や Kāpu Bōya), is seen in the team's logo. Their other mascot, "Slyly"(スラィリー Surairī), bears a resemblance to the Phillie Phanatic of the Philadelphia Phillies and has been with the team since 1995. Both Slyly and the Phillie Phanatic were designed by Harrison/Erickson which has also worked with Sesame Street and Jim Henson. The Slyly costume design was also previously used as Duncan the Dragon for the New Jersey Nets.
 The first Japanese baseball dog "Mickey"(ミッキー Mikkī) was employed between 2005 and 2007. Mickey was a Golden Retriever who wore jersey number 111, and brought new balls to the umpire from the dugout during the game. Mickey died in 2009 at the age of 11.
 Until 2015, Hiroshima Municipal Stadium was closed every year on August 6 in memorial of the atomic bombings of Hiroshima and Nagasaki. The team always played in other stadiums, even if a home game was scheduled for that day. The team played their first August 6 home game at Mazda Zoom Zoom Stadium in 2015. During the game all Carp players wore the uniform number 86 representing the date of the event 70 years prior, and PEACE on the front to symbolize the city's everlasting goal for world peace.

Carp Academies
The Carp was the first Japanese baseball team to establish a baseball academy outside Japan. The team was unable to recruit non-Japanese players from the major leagues due to financial constraints, and the academy was established to cheaply send young players to play in Japan. The Carp Baseball Academy was created in the Dominican Republic in 1990, and Robinson Checo became the first player imported to Japan from the academy in 1995. Checo achieved moderate success in Japan, leading to further imports which include later-MLB players Timo Pérez and Alfonso Soriano.

In 2004, the Carp started a pitching academy in Guangdong, China, in an attempt "to expand the range of baseball in Asia."

Players of note

MLB players
Active:
Kenta Maeda (2016–)
Seiya Suzuki (2022-)

Retired:
Colby Lewis (2002–2004, 2006–2007, 2010–2012, 2014–2016)
Hiroki Kuroda (2008–2014)
Ken Takahashi (2009)
Richie Scheinblum (1975–1976)
Alfonso Soriano (1999–2014)

Retired numbers
  (1975–1987), (#28:1965–1974)
  (1971–1986, 2001–2005), (#27:1969–1970), (#88:1989–1993 as manager)
  (1997–2007, 2015–2016)

Honored numbers
  (1990–2013) -  Seiya Suzuki (2019–2021)
  (1989–2005) -  Shota Dobayashi (2013–)
  (2008–2015) -  Masato Morishita (2020–）
  (1976–1994) -  Katsuhiro Nagakawa (2003–2019) -  Ryoji Kuribayashi (2021–）
  (1999–2007、2016–2018)

Managers

Farm team
The team has a farm team in the lower Western League. Also named Toyo Carp.

Built in 1993, the facility has a large main (seating for 3500) playing field with right and left bleachers (no seating in centre field) and a smaller throwing field next to it.

References

External links 

  Hiroshima Carp official web site
  japanesebaseball.com Carp page
  Carp train (operated by Hiroden)

 
Nippon Professional Baseball teams
Sports teams in Hiroshima
Baseball teams established in 1950
Articles containing video clips